Phlygonium or Phlygonion was a city of ancient Phocis destroyed by Philip II of Macedon at the end of the Phocian War (346 BCE). Pliny the Elder calls it Phlygone, and erroneously represents it as a city of Boeotia.

Its site is tentatively located at the Palaiokastro (old castle) near Ano Tseresi.

References

Populated places in ancient Phocis
Former populated places in Greece
Destroyed cities